James "Jock" Hepburn (born c. 1860) was a Scottish footballer who played as a left back.

Career
Born in Alloa, Hepburn played club football for Alloa Athletic, and made one appearance for Scotland in 1891. He also served as treasurer and secretary of Alloa Athletic, and as of 2013 remains their only ever Scottish international player. He later served as secretary of the Fifeshire Football Association.

References

1860 births
Date of birth missing
Scottish footballers
Scotland international footballers
Alloa Athletic F.C. players
Association football fullbacks
Year of death missing
Place of death missing
People from Alloa
Sportspeople from Clackmannanshire